Costantino Fiaschetti was an 18th-century Roman architect. He is mostly known today for the Fountain in the Piazza del Mercato in Spoleto, designed by him in 1746.

References

Year of birth missing
Year of death missing
18th-century Italian architects
Architects from Rome